Pool A (Kuala Lumpur) of the 2022 Billie Jean King Cup Asia/Oceania Zone Group II was one of four pools in the Asia/Oceania zone of the 2022 Billie Jean King Cup. Five teams competed in a round robin competition, with each team proceeding to their respective sections of the play-offs: the top team played for advancement to Group I in 2023.

Standings 

Standings are determined by: 1. number of wins; 2. number of matches; 3. in two-team ties, head-to-head records; 4. in three-team ties, (a) percentage of matches won (head-to-head records if two teams remain tied), then (b) percentage of sets won (head-to-head records if two teams remain tied), then (c) percentage of games won (head-to-head records if two teams remain tied), then (d) Billie Jean King Cup rankings.

Round-robin

Chinese Taipei vs. Iran

Hong Kong vs. Vietnam

Chinese Taipei vs. Laos

Hong Kong vs. Iran

Chinese Taipei vs. Hong Kong

Vietnam vs. Laos

Chinese Taipei vs. Vietnam

Iran vs. Laos

Hong Kong vs. Laos

Iran vs. Vietnam

References

External links 
 Billie Jean King Cup website

2022 Billie Jean King Cup Asia/Oceania Zone